Joseph Oriol (José Orioli) (23 November 1650 – 23 March 1702) was a Spanish Roman Catholic priest now venerated as a saint in the Catholic Church who is called the "Thaumaturgus of Barcelona".

He was beatified under Pope Pius VII on 5 September 1808 and Pope Pius X later canonized him as a saint on 20 May 1909.

Life
Joseph Oriol was born on 23 November 1650.

He studied at the University of Barcelona and received his doctorate in theological studies on 1 August 1674.

He was ordained as a priest on 30 May 1676.  He visited Rome in 1686 and was granted a benefice in the church of Santa Maria del Pi in Barcelona at the behest of Pope Innocent XI. Wanting to experience martyrdom, he went to Rome in April 1698 to offer himself for the foreign missions but he fell sick at Marseilles and returned to Barcelona. He was said to have prophetic and miraculous powers. The dying, the blind, the deaf and dumb, the lame, and the paralytic, were said to be instantly cured by him.

He is buried in the Santa Maria del Pi Church in Barcelona.

Veneration

He was beatified by Pius VII, 5 September 1806, and canonized by Pius X, 20 May 1909. His feast occurs on 23 March.

External links
Joseph Oriol at the Catholic Encyclopedia
Joseph Oriol

Catalan Roman Catholic saints
Spanish Roman Catholic saints
Clergy from Barcelona
1650 births
1702 deaths
17th-century Spanish Roman Catholic priests
17th-century Christian saints
Canonizations by Pope Pius X
University of Barcelona alumni
Beatifications by Pope Pius VII